Alberta Provincial Highway No. 33, commonly referred to as Highway 33 and officially named Grizzly Trail, is a north–south highway in west–central Alberta, Canada.

Highway 33 begins at Highway 43 near the hamlet of Gunn and travels north to the town of Barrhead. North of Barrhead, Highway 33 turns northwest, crossing the Athabasca River at Fort Assiniboine, before reaching the town of Swan Hills. Highway 33 continues north from Swan Hills to Highway 2 east of Kinuso.

History 
Highway 33 follows the original Klondike Trail, which was advertised by Edmonton merchants as the shortest route to the Yukon during the Klondike Gold Rush, from the Athabasca River at Pruden's Crossing, near Fort Assiniboine, through present-day Swan Hills and along the Swan River to north to present-day Kinuso. The trail followed a very difficult and dangerous route and by 1901-02 use of the trail declined, soon after it was abandoned altogether in favour of other routes to the Peace River area.

In the 1970s, Highway 33 was extended north to Barrhead from Gunn, resulting in an  gap between Alberta Beach and Gunn. Highway 18, which ran between Barrhead and Swan Hills, was renumbered to Highway 33 and the highway was extended north to Kinuso. In , the original section to Alberta Beach became part of Highway 633.

Major intersections 
From south to north:

Photos

References 

033